A height function is a function that quantifies the complexity of mathematical objects. In Diophantine geometry, height functions quantify the size of solutions to Diophantine equations and are typically functions from a set of points on algebraic varieties (or a set of algebraic varieties) to the real numbers.

For instance, the classical or naive height over the rational numbers is typically defined to be the maximum of the numerators and denominators of the coordinates (e.g.  for the coordinates ), but in a logarithmic scale.

Significance
Height functions allow mathematicians to count objects, such as rational points, that are otherwise infinite in quantity. For instance, the set of rational numbers of naive height (the maximum of the numerator and denominator when expressed in lowest terms) below any given constant is finite despite the set of rational numbers being infinite.

In other cases, height functions can distinguish some objects based on their complexity. For instance, the subspace theorem proved by  demonstrates that points of small height (i.e. small complexity) in projective space lie in a finite number of hyperplanes and generalizes Siegel's theorem on integral points and solution of the S-unit equation.

Several outstanding unsolved problems about the heights of rational points on algebraic varieties, such as the Manin conjecture and Vojta's conjecture, have far-reaching implications for problems in Diophantine approximation, Diophantine equations, arithmetic geometry, and mathematical logic.

History
An early form of height function was proposed by Giambattista Benedetti (c. 1563), who argued that the consonance of a musical interval could be measured by the product of its numerator and denominator (in reduced form); see .

Heights in Diophantine geometry were initially developed by André Weil and Douglas Northcott beginning in the 1920s. Innovations in 1960s were the Néron–Tate height and the realization that heights were linked to projective representations in much the same way that ample line bundles are in other parts of algebraic geometry. In the 1970s, Suren Arakelov developed Arakelov heights in Arakelov theory. In 1983, Faltings developed his theory of Faltings heights in his proof of Faltings's theorem.

Height functions in Diophantine geometry

Naive height
Classical or naive height is defined in terms of ordinary absolute value on homogeneous coordinates. It is typically a logarithmic scale and therefore can be viewed as being proportional to the "algebraic complexity" or number of bits needed to store a point. It is typically defined to be the logarithm of the maximum absolute value of the vector of coprime integers obtained by multiplying through by a lowest common denominator. This may be used to define height on a point in projective space over Q, or of a polynomial, regarded as a vector of coefficients, or of an algebraic number, from the height of its minimal polynomial.

The naive height of a rational number x = p/q (in lowest terms) is 
 multiplicative height 
 logarithmic height: 

Néron–Tate height

The Néron–Tate height, or canonical height, is a quadratic form on the Mordell–Weil group of rational points of an abelian variety defined over a global field. It is named after André Néron, who first defined it as a sum of local heights, and John Tate, who defined it globally in an unpublished work.

Weil height
The Weil height is defined on a projective variety X over a number field K equipped with a line bundle L on X. Given a very ample line bundle L0 on X, one may define a height function using the naive height function h. Since L0 is very ample, its complete linear system gives a map ϕ from X to projective space. Then for all points p on X, define

One may write an arbitrary line bundle L on X as the difference of two very ample line bundles L1 and L2 on X, up to Serre's twisting sheaf O(1), so one may define the Weil height hL on X with respect to L via

(up to O(1)).

Arakelov height
The Arakelov height on a projective space over the field of algebraic numbers is a global height function with local contributions coming from Fubini–Study metrics on the Archimedean fields and the usual metric on the non-Archimedean fields. It is the usual Weil height equipped with a different metric.

Faltings height
The Faltings height of an abelian variety defined over a number field is a measure of its arithmetic complexity. It is defined in terms of the height of a metrized line bundle.

Height functions in algebra

Height of a polynomial
For a polynomial P of degree n given by

the height H(P) is defined to be the maximum of the magnitudes of its coefficients:

One could similarly define the length''' L(P) as the sum of the magnitudes of the coefficients:

Relation to Mahler measure
The Mahler measure M(P)  of P is also a measure of the complexity of P. The three functions H(P), L(P) and M(P) are related by the inequalities

where  is the binomial coefficient.

Height functions in automorphic forms
One of the conditions in the definition of an automorphic form on the general linear group of an adelic algebraic group is moderate growth, which is an asymptotic condition on the growth of a height function on the general linear group viewed as an affine variety.

Other height functions

See also
abc conjecture
Birch and Swinnerton-Dyer conjecture
Elliptic Lehmer conjecture
Heath-Brown–Moroz constant
Height of a formal group law
Height zeta function
Raynaud's isogeny theorem
Tree height

References

Sources

 → Contains an English translation of

External links
 Polynomial height at Mathworld

Polynomials
Abelian varieties
Elliptic curves
Diophantine geometry
Algebraic number theory
Algebra